Tillman is an unincorporated community in Jasper County, South Carolina, United States. Tillman has a post office with ZIP code 29943, which opened on August 2, 1880.

Tillman School, which is listed on the National Register of Historic Places, is located in Tillman.

References

Unincorporated communities in Jasper County, South Carolina
Unincorporated communities in South Carolina